The 1994–95 NBA season was the Warriors’ 49th season in the National Basketball Association, and 33rd in the San Francisco Bay Area. During the off-season, the Warriors acquired Ricky Pierce and top draft pick Carlos Rogers from the Seattle SuperSonics. After having finished 50–32 the previous season, the Warriors made a number of deals to toughen the team in the middle by trading Billy Owens to the Miami Heat in exchange for Rony Seikaly. Before the season even started, second-year star Chris Webber began the season by exercising his option to become a restricted free agent, claiming irreconcilable differences with head coach Don Nelson. He asked to be traded, and the Warriors obliged, sending him to the Washington Bullets in exchange for Tom Gugliotta, who would later on be traded to the Minnesota Timberwolves in exchange for top draft pick Donyell Marshall midway through the season.

With the return of All-Star guard Tim Hardaway, who missed all of last season with a knee injury, the Warriors won their first five games of the season, winning 8 of their 13 games in November. However, they soon fell apart and struggled losing 18 of their next 20 games, posting ten and eight-game losing streaks respectively, as Pierce, Seikaly and Chris Mullin all missed large parts of the season due to injuries. All of this led to the resignation of Nelson after a 14–31 record at the All-Star break. Under his replacement, retired All-Star center and Hall of Famer Bob Lanier, the team finished sixth in the Pacific Division with a disappointing 26–56 record.

Latrell Sprewell led the team with 20.6 points and 1.6 steals per game, and was selected for the 1995 NBA All-Star Game, while Hardaway averaged 20.1 points, 9.3 assists and 1.4 steals per game. In addition, Mullin averaged 19.0 points, 5.0 assists and 1.5 steals per game in 25 games, while Seikaly provided the team with 12.1 points and 7.4 rebounds per game in 36 games, and Pierce contributed 12.5 points per game off the bench in 27 games. Chris Gatling provided with 13.7 points, 7.6 rebounds per game and shot .633 in field-goal percentage, while Victor Alexander averaged 10.0 points and 5.8 rebounds per game, and Marshall was named to the NBA All-Rookie Second Team. Rogers averaged 8.9 points and 5.7 rebounds per game in only just 49 games, while Keith Jennings contributed 7.4 points and 4.7 assists per game, and top draft pick Clifford Rozier provided with 6.8 points and 7.4 rebounds per game.

Following the season, Pierce signed as a free agent with the Indiana Pacers, while Rogers and Alexander were both traded to the newly expansion Toronto Raptors, Jennings left in the 1995 NBA Expansion Draft, and Lanier was fired as head coach.

Draft picks

Roster

Regular season

Season standings

z - clinched division title
y - clinched division title
x - clinched playoff spot

Record vs. opponents

Game log

|- align="center" bgcolor="#ffcccc"
| 14
| December 1, 19947:30p.m. PST
| Houston
| L 109–113
| Sprewell (30)
| Gugliotta (13)
| Hardaway, Jennings (6)
| Oakland-Alameda County Coliseum Arena15,025
| 8–6
|- align="center" bgcolor="#ffcccc"
| 26
| December 29, 19945:30p.m. PST
| @ Houston
| L 124–126
| Hardaway (32)
| Gugliotta (12)
| Hardaway (10)
| The Summit16,611
| 10–16

|- align="center"
|colspan="9" bgcolor="#bbcaff"|All-Star Break
|- style="background:#cfc;"
|- bgcolor="#bbffbb"
|- align="center" bgcolor="#ffcccc"
| 52
| February 25, 19955:30p.m. PST
| @ Houston
| L 105–112
| Sprewell (30)
| Alexander (9)
| Hardaway (8)
| The Summit16,611
| 16–36

|- align="center" bgcolor="#ffcccc"
| 73
| April 6, 19957:30p.m. PDT
| Houston
| L 102–110
| Legler (24)
| Rozier (21)
| Jennings (8)
| Oakland-Alameda County Coliseum Arena15,025
| 23–50

Player statistics

1. Statistics with the Warriors.

Awards and records

Awards
NBA All-Rookie Teams 
 Donyell Marshall – All-Rookie Second Team

1995 NBA All-Star Game 
 Latrell Sprewell (second participation, first as a starter)

Transactions

Trades

Free agents

Player Transactions Citation:

References

See also
 1994-95 NBA season

Golden State Warriors seasons
Golden
Golden
Golden State